Tracker is an American indie rock ensemble from Portland, Oregon. The act was founded in 1998 by John Askew, a freelance audio engineer and writer for Tape Op magazine.

Background
Askew, a multi-instrumentalist, initially performed studio recordings with little (if any) assistance, and recruited a revolving line of musicians for live performances. Among the artists in tow include Michael Schorr, the drummer with Death Cab for Cutie as well as Dave Harding, the bassist with Richmond Fontaine. Schorr would eventually become a mainstay with the act.

As Death Cab for Cutie came to prominence, Tracker shared stages with them, alongside Giant Sand, Calexico, and The Black Heart Procession.

Discography
Ames (2001 release on the FILMguerrero imprint)
Polk (2002 release via FILMguerrero)
Blankets (2004 release via FILMguerrero)

External links
Official site
Band profile at FILMguerrero

Indie rock musical groups from Oregon
Musical groups from Portland, Oregon